Queen Janggyeong may refer to:

Queen Janggyeong (Goryeo) (died after 1170), wife of Uijong of Goryeo
Queen Janggyeong (Joseon) (1491–1515), wife of Jungjong of Joseon